Count Imre Zichy de Zich et Vásonkeő (22 July 1909 – 28 September 1999) was a Hungarian left-handed amateur tennis player, count and inventor. He was related to the Hungarian Asian explorer Jenő Zichy. During the Second World War he emigrated to Spain where he died at the age of 90. He was a member of the Hungary Davis Cup team between 1933–34 and was mainly a doubles and mixed doubles player winning several titles during his career. He was also a three-times national doubles champion.

Biography
Count Zichy was born in the family property at Sárszentmihály, being the fifth son of Count Raphael Zichy and wife, née Margravine Edina Pallavicini, and lived in Hungary until 1943, when he moved to Madrid and stay there for the rest of his life. On 29 August 1947, he married in Enschede Dutch divorcée Edith Marie Ledeboer, formerly Mrs. Oswald, and had a single child:

Count Imre Helmich Paul Zichy (b. 28 June 1952), who married on 2 April 1979 María Teresa Sánchez-Arjona y Eyaralar, daughter of Manuel Sánchez-Arjona y Courtoy and María Teresa Eyaralar y Azcona and had five children:
Countess Edina Melanie Maria (b. 14 January 1980), married on 30 April 2010 Jose Márquez y Gonzalez de Gregorio, eldest son of Rafael Márquez, 9th Count of las Torres de Alcorrín and former wife Pilar González de Gregorio, 13th Duchess of Fernandina
Countess Stephanie Charlotte Maria (b. 27 September 1983), married Álvaro Rosillo Echevarría, son of the late Francisco de Borja Rosillo y Colón de Carvajal and Virgina de Echevarría y Wakonigg.
Count Imre Enrique Ignacio (b. 18 August 1987)
Count Nándor Károly (b. 8 August 1989)
Countess Teresa Manuela (b. 7 Juni 1992)

In 1957 he invented the reversing light for cars and its operating system. Imre Zichy died on 28 September 1999 in Madrid. His funeral was held at the San Agustín del Guadalix Church on 26 October 1999.

Tennis career
Count Zichy started his tennis career by competing in the Hungarian Junior Championships where he was a runner-up for the doubles and third in singles in 1929. Later he won the Hungarian National Tennis Championships in doubles (1931, '32, '34) and in mixed doubles (1931). He also won the Hungarian International Tennis Championships in doubles in 1931 and 1932.  He kept playing tennis in Spain.

Doubles

Titles

Runner-up

Mixed doubles

Titles

Runner-up

Davis Cup

Friendly/Exhibition matches

Ancestry

Bibliography
Béla von Kehrling, ed. (1931). Tennisz és Golf. III (Budapest, Hungary: Egyesült Kő-, Könyvnyomda. Könyv- és Lapkiadó Rt.) 1–24 (in Hungarian). Retrieved 10 February 2012.

References

External links
 
 
 

1909 births
1999 deaths
Imre
Hungarian male tennis players
Sportspeople from Fejér County
People from Madrid
Hungarian expatriate sportspeople in Spain
20th-century Hungarian inventors